Defending champion Roger Federer defeated Mardy Fish in the final, 6–7(5–7), 7–6(7–1), 6–4 to win the men's singles tennis title at the 2010 Cincinnati Masters. It was his fourth Cincinnati Masters title, his record-equaling 17th Masters title overall (tying Andre Agassi's tally), and his 63rd career title overall (tying Björn Borg's tally).

Seeds
The top eight seeds receive a bye into the second round.

Main draw

Finals

Top half

Section 1

Section 2

Bottom half

Section 3

Section 4

Qualifying

Seeds

Qualifiers

Qualifying draw

First qualifier

Second qualifier

Third qualifier

Fourth qualifier

Fifth qualifier

Sixth qualifier

Seventh qualifier

External links
 Main Draw
 Qualifying Draw

Masters - Singles